The Kashmir Princess, or Air India Flight 300, was a chartered Lockheed L-749A Constellation Air India flight.  On 11 April 1955, it was damaged in midair by a bomb explosion and crashed into the South China Sea while en route from Bombay, India, and Hong Kong to Jakarta, Indonesia. Sixteen of those on board were killed, while three survived. The explosion was an assassination attempt targeting Chinese Premier Zhou Enlai, who missed the flight either due to a medical emergency or, as one historian concluded, because he had prior knowledge. The Chinese government insisted that Hong Kong authorities investigate; they concluded that the Kuomintang (KMT) were responsible for the bombing.

Explosion
Flight 300 departed Hong Kong at 04:25 GMT carrying Chinese and Eastern European delegates, mainly journalists, to the Afro-Asian Bandung Conference in Jakarta. At approximately 09:25 GMT the crew heard an explosion; smoke quickly entered the cabin from a fire on the right wing directly behind the No. 3 (or right inboard) engine. Upon hearing the explosion and seeing the fire-warning light for the baggage compartment come on, the captain shut off the No. 3 engine and feathered its propeller, fearing the engine would catch fire. This left three engines running. The crew sent out three distress signals giving their position over the Natuna Islands before the radio went dead.

The captain tried to land the plane on the sea, but the depressurising cabin and the failing circuits made that impossible. Additionally, smoke was seeping into the cockpit. Left with no other option, the crew issued life jackets and opened the emergency doors to ensure a quick escape as the plane plunged into the sea below.

Crash
The starboard wing struck water first, tearing the plane into three parts. The aircraft maintenance engineer (ground engineer), navigator and first officer escaped and were later found by the Indonesian Coast Guard. The remaining 16 passengers and crew members, however, drowned at sea.

Investigators believed that the explosion had been caused by a time bomb placed aboard the aircraft by a Kuomintang secret agent who was attempting to assassinate Chinese Premier Zhou Enlai, who had been scheduled to board the plane to attend the conference but had changed his travel plans at the last minute.

Zhou Enlai 
The target of the assassination attempt, Zhou Enlai, had planned to fly from Beijing to Hong Kong and then on to Jakarta on Kashmir Princess. An emergency appendectomy delayed his arrival in Hong Kong; he left China three days after the crash and flew to Rangoon to meet with Indian Prime Minister Jawaharlal Nehru and Burmese Prime Minister U Nu before continuing on to Bandung to attend the conference.

Some historians have argued that Zhou may have known about the assassination plot beforehand and that the premier did not undergo an appendectomy at the time. Steve Tsang of Oxford University wrote in the September 1994 edition of The China Quarterly, "Evidence now suggests that Zhou knew of the plot beforehand and secretly changed his travel plans, though he did not stop a decoy delegation of lesser cadres from taking his place."

Investigation 
The day after the crash, China's Foreign Ministry issued a statement that described the bombing as "a murder by the special service organizations of the United States and Chiang Kai-shek", while Hong Kong Governor Sir Alexander Grantham maintained that the plane was not tampered with in Hong Kong. However, on 26 May, an Indonesian board of inquiry later announced that a time bomb with an American-made MK-7 detonator was responsible for the crash and it was highly probable that the bomb was placed on the plane in Hong Kong.

The Hong Kong authorities offered HK$100,000 for information leading to the arrest of those responsible. They questioned 71 people connected with the servicing of the Air India flight. When police began to focus on Chow Tse-ming, a janitor for Hong Kong Aircraft Engineering Co., he stowed away to Taiwan on a CIA-owned Civil Air Transport aircraft. The Hong Kong police reported that a warrant charging a murder conspiracy was issued, but the man with the name Chow Tse-ming in the warrant had flown to Taiwan on 18 May 1955, and Chow Tse-ming had three aliases.

The Hong Kong police concluded that the Kuomintang had recruited Chow to plant the bomb to kill Zhou Enlai. Apparently, he had bragged to friends about his role in the bombing, and had also spent large amounts of money before he left Hong Kong. The Hong Kong Police tried to extradite Chow, but Taiwan refused and denied that Chow was a KMT agent.

Steve Tsang collected evidence from British, Taiwanese, American and Hong Kong archives that points directly to KMT agents operating in Hong Kong as the perpetrators of the aircraft bombing. According to him, the KMT had a special-operations group stationed in Hong Kong responsible for assassination and sabotage. Designated the Hong Kong Group under Major-General Kong Hoi-ping, it operated a network of 90 agents. In March 1955, the group recruited Chow for the assassination because his job at the airport gave him easy access to the Air India plane, and offered him HK$600,000 and refuge in Taiwan, if necessary.

A Chinese Foreign Ministry document declassified in 2004 also indicates that the KMT secret service was responsible for the bombing.

China had from the outset accused the United States of involvement in the bombing, but while the CIA had considered a plan to assassinate Zhou Enlai at this time, the Church Committee - a US Senate select committee that investigated the US intelligence community - reported that these plans were disapproved of and "strongly censured" by Washington. In a 1971 face-to-face meeting in the Great Hall of the People in Beijing, Zhou directly asked Henry Kissinger about US involvement in the bombing. Kissinger responded, "As I told the Prime Minister the last time, he vastly overestimates the competence of the CIA." However, in 1967, an American defector in Moscow, John Discoe Smith, had claimed that he had delivered a suitcase containing an explosive mechanism to a Chinese nationalist in Hong Kong.

Commemorations 
Captain D.K. Jatar and stewardess Gloria Eva Berry, were posthumously awarded the Ashoka Chakra Award for "most conspicuous bravery, daring and self-sacrifice". The same award was later given to the survivors of the incident: First officer M.C Dixit, ground maintenance engineer Anant Karnik, and navigator J.C. Pathak. Together, they were the first civilians to be awarded the Ashoka Chakra Award for outstanding bravery, and Berry was the first woman to ever receive the award.

In 2005, the Xinhua News Agency hosted a symposium to commemorate the 50th anniversary of the crash; three Xinhua journalists had been among the victims.

See also
 Timeline of airliner bombing attacks

References

Further reading  
 Li, Hong. "The Truth Behind the “Kashmir Princess” Incident". In Selected Essays on the History of Contemporary China, (Leiden, The Netherlands: Brill, 2015) doi: https://doi.org/10.1163/9789004292673_013
 "Air India: The Story of the Aircraft", Air Whiners, 2004-07-26
 "China marks journalists killed in premier murder plot 50 years ago", Xinhua News Agency, 2005-04-11
 "China spills Zhou Enlai secret", China Daily, 2004-07-21
 Minnick, Wendell L. "Target: Zhou Enlai", Far Eastern Economic Review, 1995-07-13, pages 54–55. (Archive)

External links 
 
Final Report

Explosions in 1955
Zhou Enlai
Aviation accidents and incidents in 1955
Mass murder in 1955
Massacres committed by Taiwan
Airliner bombings
Assassinations
Cross-Strait relations
Failed assassination attempts in Asia
History of Hong Kong
1955 in China
1955 in Indonesia
Terrorist incidents in Asia in 1955
Anti-communist terrorism
Aviation accidents and incidents in Indonesia
Accidents and incidents involving the Lockheed Constellation
Air India accidents and incidents
Terrorist incidents in Indonesia
Hong Kong–Taiwan relations
CIA activities in Asia
Individual aircraft
April 1955 events
State-sponsored terrorism
1955 disasters in Indonesia